Water Mill at Kollen Near Nuenen (Dutch: Collse watermolen, F48a, JH488) is an oil painting of the Watermill at Kollen, created on 28-29 May 1884 by Vincent van Gogh during the period when he was living at Nuenen nearby.  It measures .  

Van Gogh mentioned the work in a letter to Anthon van Rappard dated 29 May 1884 (letter 448) in which he wrote "Since you left I've been working on a Water mill - the one I asked about in that little inn at the station ... with two red roofs, and which one views square on from the front - with poplars around it."

After passing through the hands of dealers and collectors in the Netherlands and then the US, it was sold in November 2017 by Sotheby's in New York for US$3.1 million, catalogued under the title Le Moulin à l'eau. It was acquired by the Noordbrabants Museum, in 's-Hertogenbosch, in the south of The Netherlands.

See also
 List of works by Vincent van Gogh

References
 Collse watermolen, Noordbrabants Museum
 Vincent van Goghs Collse watermolen na ruim een eeuw definitief terug in Brabant, Noordbrabants Museum, 15 November 2017
 Sotheby's catalogue, 14 November 2017
 448: Letter To Anthon van Rappard. Nuenen, on or about Thursday, 29 May 1884, Van Gogh Letters

External links

Paintings by Vincent van Gogh
1884 paintings
Water in art